Giovanni Orgera (14 December 1894 – 12 December 1967) was an Italian politician. He was born in Naples, Kingdom of Italy. He was podestà of Naples (1936–1943) as a member of the National Fascist Party. He was governor of Rome from January to June 1944 as a member of the Republican Fascist Party. He later went to Desenzano del Garda, Province of Brescia, Lombardy as a supporter of the Italian Social Republic. He died in Rome, Italy.

References

1894 births
1967 deaths
20th-century Italian politicians
Mayors of Naples
Mayors of Rome
People of Campanian descent